Dopasia gracilis, known commonly as the Asian glass lizard, the Burmese glass lizard, or the Indian glass snake, is a species of legless lizard in the family Anguidae. The species is endemic to Asia.

Geographic range
D. gracilis is found in southern China, northern India, northern Myanmar, Nepal, Thailand, and Vietnam. It may also be found in northern Bangladesh and Laos.

Description
From A. C. L. G. Günther (1864) The Reptiles of British India: 
This species is very closely allied to its European congener, differing, however, from it by the total absence of the rudimentary, scale-like hind limbs of that species. From the North American Glass Snake it differs in having the palatine teeth small, and arranged in a very narrow band. The upper surface of its head is covered with a large vertical plate and three smaller occipitals behind, the space between the vertical and the rostral being filled up by about five pairs of rather irregular frontals of unequal size; the superciliaries are arranged in two series. The dorsal scales form fourteen longitudinal series, each series with a slight continuous keel; the ventral scales are smooth, in ten series. The upper parts are brown, with some irregular black spots across the back.
The typical specimen is from the Khasya Hills, 15 inches long [including tail], the tail measuring 10. We may infer, from its close resemblance to Pseudopus pallasii, that its habits are similar. It probably lives in dry places, under stones, feeding on small lizards, mice, &c. The scaly covering of the upper and lower parts is so tight, that it does not admit of the same extension as in snakes or other lizards, and the Pseudopus, therefore, could not receive the same quantity of food in its stomach as those animals were it not for the expansible fold of the skin running along each side of its trunk. Whilst in other Saurians the whole skin of the belly and of the sides is extensible, the extensibility here is limited to a separate part of the skin.

Reproduction
D. gracilis is oviparous.

References

Further reading
Blyth E (1853). "Notices and descriptions of various reptiles, new or little-known. Part I". J. Asiat. Soc. Bengal 22: 639–655. (Ophiseps tessellatus, new species, p. 655).
Boulenger GA (1885). Catalogue of the Lizards in the British Museum (Natural History). Second Edition. Volume II. ... Anguidae ... London: Trustees of the British Museum (Natural History). (Taylor and Francis, printers). xiii + 497 pp. + Plates I-XXIV. (Ophisaurus gracilis, new combination, p. 283 + Plate XV, figures 1, 1a, 1b).
Boulenger GA (1890). The Fauna of British India, Including Ceylon and Burma. Reptilia and Batrachia. London: Secretary of State for India in Council. (Taylor and Francis, printers). xviii + 541 pp. (Ophisaurus gracilis, p. 159, Figure 47).
Campden-Main, Simon M. (1970). "The first record of Ophisaurus gracilis (Gray) (Sauria: Anguidae) in South Vietnam". Herpetologica 26 (1): 17–18.
Gray JE (1845). Catalogue of the Specimens of Lizards in the Collection of the British Museum. London: Trustees of the British Museum. (Edward Newman, printer). xxvii + 289 pp. (Pseudopus gracilis, new species, p. 56).
Smith MA (1935). The Fauna of British India, Including Ceylon and Burma. Reptilia and Amphibia. Vol. II.—Sauria. London: Secretary of State for India in Council. (Taylor and Francis, printers). xiii + 440 pp. + Plate I + 2 maps. (Ophisaurus gracilis, pp. 393–394, Figure 91).

Dopasia 
Reptiles of China
Reptiles of Vietnam
Reptiles described in 1845
Taxa named by John Edward Gray